Bailey Hayward (born 5 April 2001) is a Scotland international rugby league footballer who plays as a  or  for the Canterbury-Bankstown Bulldogs in the NRL.

Background
Hayward was born in Camperdown, New South Wales, Australia. He is of Scottish descent.

Playing career

Club career
In 2022, Hayward played in eight games for the Canterbury-Bankstown in the NSW Cup.

International career
In 2022, Hayward was named in the Scotland squad for the 2021 Rugby League World Cup.

References

External links
Canterbury Bulldogs profile
Scotland profile
Scotland RL profile

2001 births
Living people
Australian rugby league players
Australian people of Scottish descent
Rugby league halfbacks
Rugby league five-eighths
Rugby league players from Sydney
Scotland national rugby league team players